The Utah Water Research Laboratory (UWRL) is a research institution at Utah State University. It is the oldest and one of the largest water research facilities in the United States, and is considered one of the most well-respected such facilities in the world. The UWRL has completed more than 100 major projects around the world and operates with more than $400 million in international funding.

The UWRL was established in 1959 with funding from the Utah State Legislature, the National Science Foundation, and the National Institutes of Health, and the building at the present location on the Logan River was completed in 1980. The current facility holds over 102,000 sq. ft. of office and laboratory space, which it dedicates mostly to research and experimentation in irrigation and water engineering. The center also provides support for numerous undergraduate and graduate degree programs in the following subject areas: water resources engineering, irrigation and drainage engineering, environmental engineering, agricultural and water resources economics, sociology and political science, watershed management, and arid land agriculture.

The Water Lab, as it is known locally, also works with the International Irrigation Center, housed in USU's College of Engineering, and has close ties with many major Middle Eastern institutions. Many high-ranking government officials and academicians in arid Middle Eastern nations received their start at the UWRL. Research performed there often applies directly to vital needs in arid nations, as a recent report listed Utah as America's second-driest state.

References

External links 
 UWRL official site
 Utah State University

Utah State University
Buildings and structures in Logan, Utah
1959 establishments in Utah
Hydraulic laboratories